Pławno  is a village in the administrative district of Gmina Gidle, within Radomsko County, Łódź Voivodeship, in south-central Poland. The village has a population of 1,200.

World War II
On September 4, 1939, during the German invasion of Poland which started World War II, German troops carried out a massacre of Polish inhabitants of the village (see Nazi crimes against the Polish nation). Afterwards, the village was under German occupation until 1945. The fate of the Jews of Pławno was sealed in 1942. Mayoral orders of the German occupiers are quoted below.

22 January 1942

It is impossible to create a residential quarter for Jews (Ghetto) within the local district because there are 460 Jews in the district of Pławno, and the Pławno borough itself is too small to lodge that amount in a body. Moreover, the farmers residing here could not be removed from their dwellings and farm buildings. It would only be practicable to resettle the Jews from here to Ghetto in Radomsko.
Mayor of Pławno district.
Signed Karl Rusche [stamp]

In German: 
Bürgermeister der Gem. Pławno
gez. Karl Rusche (stamp)

19 September 1942

"The resettlement of the Jews of Pławno to the Jewish residential quarter of the Pławno borough has to take place on 22 September 1942, until 18:00. The Jews must take all things and machines with them. The police take charge of the dwellings. No Jew must be present in the borough past the 22nd."

In German:

References

Villages in Radomsko County
Massacres of Poles
Nazi war crimes in Poland